Saluk is a village in Hamadan Province, Iran.

Saluk, also rendered as Salug, may also refer to:
 Saluk-e Olya, Kurdistan Province
 Saluk-e Sofla, Kurdistan Province

See also
 Salug (disambiguation)
 Sa'luk, a character in Disney's Aladdin